Waterbeach railway station is on the Fen line in the east of England, serving the village of Waterbeach, Cambridgeshire. Its three-letter station code is WBC.

The station and most trains calling are operated by Great Northern, with limited peak services being operated by Greater Anglia.

Waterbeach station is unstaffed, and has only basic waiting shelters on each of the two platforms. All the station buildings have been demolished. The platforms are staggered on each side of a half barrier level crossing. Until electrification and the automation of the crossing, the platforms were located opposite each other.

History

Before electrification, British Rail services often did not stop at Waterbeach; or if they did, stops would be unofficial. However, since electrification, virtually all King's Lynn/Ely - Cambridge/London services have stopped there (the present timetable shows only three Monday - Friday in both directions not stopping there) passenger numbers surged, with people all across the area north of Cambridge in South Cambridgeshire using it as their primary station. As a result, passenger numbers are nearly as high as Downham Market, and the station sees a lot of parking problems.

Future plans
Plans to develop a New Town of 8,000 to 9,000 homes on the former Waterbeach Barracks site have been outlined by South Cambridgeshire District Council. As part of the proposal, there are plans to relocate the station to a new site and extend the platforms to accommodate 12 car trains.

Services
Great Northern operate all off-peak services at Waterbeach using  EMUs.

The typical off-peak service in trains per hour is:

The station is also served by a number of peak-hour services operated by Greater Anglia.

References

External links 

Fen Line Users Association (FLUA)

Railway stations in Cambridgeshire
DfT Category F2 stations
Former Great Eastern Railway stations
Railway stations served by Govia Thameslink Railway
Greater Anglia franchise railway stations
Railway stations in Great Britain opened in 1845
railway station